Vasilije Antonić (1860-1929) was a Serbian army officer, diplomat and politician. After finishing the Military Academy in Belgrade as the second in class he went on to serve on a number of public offices and posts, including the Minister of Foreign Affairs and the Minister of Defence. As a Minister of Defence he initiated several reforms and introduced new modern equipment for the Serbian Army.

References

1860 births
1929 deaths
Serbian politicians
Defence ministers of Serbia
Foreign ministers of Serbia